Ryoko Suzuki (born 1970) is a contemporary Japanese artist, using photography as her main medium. Her work uses highly constructed images to comment on the designated social roles of women living in contemporary Japan.

She was born in 1970 in Hokkaido, Japan. In 1990 she graduated from Junior College of Art at Musashino Art University, Tokyo and in 1999 she graduated from Sokei Academy of Fine Art,Tokyo.

The photographs of the artist concern the homogenized standards of beauty on display in mainstream visual culture. Her photographs approach the issue of how women and girls are represented in society and the media, literally comparing her own image to cartoon sex objects of contemporary popular culture. In her series Anikora, Suzuki adapts the idol collage (aidoru koraju), often used to superimpose famous women's faces onto nude bodies. In the work she collages her own face over anime torsos.

In 2007, her work was recognized through its inclusion in a major international survey, “Global Feminisms" at the Brooklyn Museum, New York.

References

Feminist artists
Japanese contemporary artists
Japanese photographers
Japanese women photographers
1970 births
Living people